World Goth Day is observed annually on 22 May. The Official World Goth Day site defines it as "a day where the goth scene gets to celebrate its own being, and an opportunity to make its presence known to the rest of the world."

World Goth Day originated in the United Kingdom in 2009 initially as Goth Day, a smaller scale celebration of the gothic subculture inspired from the broadcasting of a special set of shows on BBC Radio 6. These shows planned to focus on various music subcultures throughout a week of May 2009, including Goth music, which was aired on May 22nd. 

UK-based Goth DJ 'Lee Meadows' aka DJ 'Cruel Britannia' (now currently known as 'BatBoy Slim') wrote a Myspace blog suggesting the idea of initiating a 'Goth Day' to a very positive reception. In 2010, he and London based Goth DJ 'martin oldgoth' (lower case in name intentional) decided to take the concept globally, both 'as a bit of fun' and to also create an environment of positivity and unity within the Goth community. An official website and social media presence were consequently created with the aim of promoting the idea of a 'World Goth Day' and to also provide a comprehensive list of international events which would take place on or around the chosen date of May 22nd. Also at this point, 'John Holley' stepped in to undertake and continues to run the official Facebook page for World Goth Day.

World Goth Day celebrates the sub cultural aspects of the Goth subculture. Aspects of the culture like fashion, music and art are celebrated by fashion shows, art exhibitions and music performance. Many of the events feature local Goth bands, and some have taken on a charity aspect with events in the United Kingdom and Australia supporting favoured charities like the UK Sophie Lancaster Foundation, a charity that tries to curb prejudice and hatred against subcultures.

References

External links

"World Goth Day: British Goths on what 22 May means to them" at Metro, 2018
"Get Your Goth On: World Goth Day Returns" at bryanreesman.com, 2011
"Every Day Is World Goth Day (But Especially Today)" The Hairpin, 2015

Goth subculture
May observances
Recurring events established in 2009
Unofficial observances